Telch is a surname. Notable people with this surname include:

Ari Telch (born 1962), Mexican actor
Christian Telch (born 1988), German footballer
Jorge Telch (born 1942), Mexican diver
Michael Telch (born 1953), American psychologist
Roberto Telch (1943–2014), Argentine footballer